N-acetylglucosamine-6-sulfatase (EC 3.1.6.14, glucosamine (N-acetyl)-6-sulfatase, systematic name N-acetyl-D-glucosamine-6-sulfate 6-sulfohydrolase') is an enzyme that in humans is encoded by the GNS gene. It is deficient in Sanfilippo Syndrome type IIId. It catalyses the hydrolysis of the 6-sulfate groups of the N-acetyl-D-glucosamine 6-sulfate units of heparan sulfate and keratan sulfate

 Function N-acetylglucosamine-6-sulfatase is a lysosomal enzyme found in all cells. It is involved in the catabolism of heparin, heparan sulphate, and keratan sulphate.

 Clinical significance 

Deficiency of this enzyme results in the accumulation of undergraded substrate and the lysosomal storage disorder mucopolysaccharidosis type IIID (Sanfilippo D syndrome). Mucopolysaccharidosis type IIID is the least common of the four subtypes of Sanfilippo syndrome.

 Nomenclature 

The systematic name of this enzyme is "N-acetyl-D-glucosamine-6-sulfate 6-sulfohydrolase".  Other accepted names include:
 N-acetylglucosamine-6-sulfatase,
 glucosamine (N-acetyl)-6-sulfatase,
 2-acetamido-2-deoxy-D-glucose 6-sulfate sulfatase,
 N-acetylglucosamine 6-sulfate sulfatase,
 O,N-disulfate O''-sulfohydrolase,
 acetylglucosamine 6-sulfatase,
 chondroitinsulfatase, and
 glucosamine-6-sulfatase.

References

External links
 

EC 3.1.6